Bruce William Carmichael (March 28, 1934 – April 26, 2019) was a Canadian ice hockey left winger who played 1,049 professional games, scored 401 goals, 531 assists for a total of 932 career points.

Awards and achievements
 MJHL Championship (1953)
WHL Championship (1960)
"Honoured Member" of the Manitoba Hockey Hall of Fame

External links

Bruce Carmichael's biography at Manitoba Hockey Hall of Fame

References

1934 births
2019 deaths
Canadian ice hockey left wingers
St. Boniface Canadiens players
Ice hockey people from Winnipeg